YBP 1194 is a G-type main-sequence star, class G5V, in the open cluster M67 in the constellation Cancer. It is the best solar twin found to date, having the near exact temperature and mass as the Sun. YBP 1194 has a higher metallicity than the Sun and is 0.5 billion years younger at an age of 4.2 billion years old, but due to the distance, the error bar is high at ±1.6 billion years. It is about 2,772 light-years (850 parsecs) from the Sun. It is packed in a small cluster, Messier 67, with a radius of 10 ly, with over 500 other stars. For comparison, the Sun has 17 stars at a distance of 10 ly and about 134 stars at a distance of 20 ly.

Planetary system
Exoplanet YBP 1194 b was discovered in January 2014 by researchers at the European Southern Observatory (ESO) when three new planets were discovered in the M67 cluster, one of them orbiting YPB 1194, showing that open star clusters are more likely to have planets orbiting them than originally thought. The exoplanet is prominently about 100 times more massive than Earth. Exoplanet YBP 1194 b when compared to the Sun-Earth system, orbits the star at about 87 million miles, closer than the planet Mercury. The orbital eccentricity of YPB 1194 b is 0.24, close to Pluto's eccentricity of 0.24905. The composition of these planets is currently unknown.

References 

Cancer (constellation)
Solar analogs
Solar twins
G-type main-sequence stars
Planetary systems with one confirmed planet
J08510080+1148527